Monni may refer to:

 Monni (band), a South Korean rock band
 Carlo Monni, an Italian actor